Adolph B. Benson, born Adolph Berndt Bengtsson, (November 22, 1881 – November 10, 1962) was an American scholar, educator and literary historian.  Adolph Benson's research focused primarily on the study of Swedish-American culture.

Biography
Adolph Benson was born in Skåne, Sweden as the eldest of nine children. He emigrated to the United States during 1892 settling in Berlin, Connecticut. He graduated from Wesleyan University  in Middletown, Connecticut (Bachelor's degree. 1907), (Master's degree. 1910).  
He taught at Columbia University,  1909-1911,  at Dartmouth College 1911-1914  and at Sheffield Scientific School  1914-1920.
In 1920, he became extraordinary professor of German and Scandinavian languages and literature at Yale University.
He was chairman of Department of Germanic Languages at  Yale University 1932-1944.

His autobiography  Farm, Forge and Philosophy: Chapters of a Swedish Immigrant's Life was published by the Swedish American Historical Society in 1961.

The papers of Adolph Burnett Benson are available from Manuscripts and Archives at the Yale University Sterling Memorial Library in New Haven, CT.

Selected bibliography

Original works
The Old Norse Element in Swedish Romanticism (1914)
Sweden and The American Revolution (1926) 
An American poet-enemy of Gustavus III of Sweden (1928) 

Swedish Rarities in the Yale University Library (1935) 
Swedes in America, 1638-1938  with Naboth Hedin (1938)
The will to succeed : stories of Swedish pioneers (1948)
Americans from Sweden with Naboth Hedin and Carl Sandburg (1950) 
American Scandinavian studies (1952) 
Farm, Forge and Philosophy: Chapters of a Swedish Immigrant's Life (1961)

Translations
Sara Videbeck and the Chapel, by Carl Jonas Love Almqvist; translation from the Swedish. (1919)
America of the Fifties: Letters of Fredrika Bremer, by Fredrika Bremer; translation from the Swedish. (1924) 
Pehr Kalm's journey to North America by Pehr Kalm; translation from the Swedish. (1961)

References

Other sources
 The Chronicle (American Swedish Historical Foundation, Spring & Summer 1956)

External links

The Journal of the Society for the Advancement of Scandinavian Study: Articles by Adolph B. Benson
Project Runeberg: translation of Carl Jonas Love Almqvist's novel Sara Videbeck and The Chapel

1881 births
1962 deaths
People from Scania
Wesleyan University alumni
Columbia University faculty
Dartmouth College  faculty
Sheffield Scientific School faculty
Yale University faculty  
People from Connecticut
Swedish emigrants to the United States
20th-century American educators
20th-century American historians
American male non-fiction writers
20th-century American male writers